Deng Yanlin (born 14 October 1998) is a Chinese football midfielder who last played for Serbian First League side FK Zemun.

Club career
Deng Yanlin started his professional football career in July 2017 when he was loaned to Chinese Super League side Guangzhou R&F's satellite team R&F in the Hong Kong Premier League. On 19 September 2017, he made his senior debut in a 3–2 away loss to Hong Kong Pegasus, coming on as a substitute for Chen Fuhai in the 75th minute.

In summer 2019, he moved to Europe and signed with Serbian second-tier side FK Zemun.

Career statistics
.

References

External links
 

1998 births
Living people
Association football midfielders
Chinese footballers
R&F (Hong Kong) players
Footballers from Guangzhou
Hong Kong Premier League players
FK Zemun players
Expatriate footballers in Serbia
21st-century Chinese people